The 2023 Rachael Heyhoe Flint Trophy is the upcoming fourth edition of the Rachael Heyhoe Flint Trophy, an English women's cricket 50-over domestic competition, which will take place between 4 April and 24 September 2023. It will feature eight teams playing in a double round-robin group stage, followed by a knock-out round. It will run alongside the Charlotte Edwards Cup. Northern Diamonds are the defending champions.

Format
Teams play each other twice in a group of eight, with the top three qualifying for the knock-out stage. This represents a doubling of group stage matches from the previous season, which saw teams play each other once. The second-placed team in the group plays the third-placed team in a play-off, with the winner advancing to play the first-placed team in the final. The final will be held at the County Ground, Northampton.

Teams
The teams will be as listed below. The Blaze changed their name prior to the 2023 season, having previously been known as Lightning.
 Central Sparks (representing Warwickshire, Worcestershire, Herefordshire, Shropshire and Staffordshire)
 Northern Diamonds (representing Yorkshire, Durham and Northumberland)
 North West Thunder (representing Lancashire, Cheshire and Cumbria)
 South East Stars (representing Surrey and Kent)
 Southern Vipers (representing Hampshire, Sussex, Berkshire, Buckinghamshire, Dorset, Isle of Wight and Oxfordshire)
 Sunrisers  (representing Middlesex, Essex, Northamptonshire, Bedfordshire, Cambridgeshire, Hertfordshire, Huntingdonshire, Norfolk and Suffolk)
 The Blaze (representing Derbyshire, Leicestershire, Nottinghamshire and Lincolnshire)
 Western Storm (representing Glamorgan, Gloucestershire, Somerset, Cornwall, Devon, Wiltshire and Cricket Wales)

Standings
Teams receive 4 points for a win. A bonus point will be given where the winning team's run rate is 1.25 or greater times that of the opposition. In case of a tie in the standings, the following tiebreakers are applied in order: highest net run rate, team that scored the most points in matches involving the tied parties, better bowling strike rate, drawing of lots.

 advances to Final
 advances to the Semi-final

Fixtures

Group stage
Source:

Play-off

Final

References

External links
 Tournament home at ESPNcricinfo

Rachael Heyhoe Flint Trophy
2023 in English women's cricket